Hainan uses a slightly different administrative system from other administrative regions of China. Most other provinces are divided entirely into prefecture-level divisions, each of which is then divided entirely into county-level divisions, which generally do not come directly under the province. In Hainan, nearly all county-level divisions (the eight districts excepted) come directly under the province. This method of division is due to Hainan's relatively sparse population. However, it is planned that the counties and cities in Hainan (excluding Sansha) would be merged into five city-level cities, just like those on the mainland area of China.

Administrative divisions
All of these administrative divisions are explained in greater detail at Administrative divisions of the People's Republic of China. This chart lists only prefecture-level and county-level divisions of Hainan.

Sansha oversees the South China Sea Islands: the Xisha (Paracel Islands), Zhongsha (Macclesfield Bank), and Nansha (Spratly Islands). The Spratlys are in reality disputed and divided among China and several neighbouring countries, while the Paracel Islands is claimed by the People's Republic of China, the Republic of China (Taiwan), and Vietnam.

Administrative divisions history

Recent changes in administrative divisions

Population composition

Prefectures

Counties

References

 
Hainan